The 67th New York State Legislature, consisting of the New York State Senate and the New York State Assembly, met from January 2 to May 7, 1844, during the second year of William C. Bouck's governorship, in Albany.

Background
Under the provisions of the New York Constitution of 1821, 32 senators were elected on general tickets in eight senatorial districts for four-year terms. They were divided into four classes, and every year eight senate seats came up for election. Assemblymen were elected countywide on general tickets to a one-year term, the whole assembly being renewed annually.

State Senator William Ruger died on May 21, 1843, leaving a vacancy in the Fifth District.

At this time there were two major political parties: the Democratic Party and the Whig Party. About this time began the split of the Democratic Party into Barnburners and Hunkers. The radical abolitionists appeared as the Liberty Party. In New York City the American Republican Party nominated a full ticket

Elections
The state election was held on November 7, 1843.

State Senator Morris Franklin (1st D.) was defeated for re-election.

Sessions
On January 1, the Democratic assemblymen met in caucus and nominated Elisha Litchfield (Hunker) for Speaker with 56 votes against 35 for Michael Hoffman (Barnburner).

The legislature met for the regular session at the Old State Capitol in Albany on January 2, 1844; and adjourned on May 7.

Elisha Litchfield (D) was elected Speaker with 90 votes against 28 for Samuel Stevens (W). James R. Rose (D) was elected Clerk of the Assembly with 89 votes against 33 for George W. Weed (W).

On February 5, the legislature re-elected State Treasurer Thomas Farrington (D).

On February 8, Henry A. Foster was elected president pro tempore of the Senate.

On May 6, the legislature enacted to reduce the number of canal commissioners from 6 to 4, and that the canal commissioners be elected statewide by popular ballot. This was the first time, since Independence, that any other office than governor and lieutenant governor was to be filled by a statewide popular election.

On June 17, U.S. Senator Nathaniel P. Tallmadge (W) resigned his seat, and was appointed as Governor of the Wisconsin Territory.

The Democratic state convention met on September 4 at Syracuse, Heman J. Redfield (Hunker) was chairman. They nominated U.S. Senator Silas Wright, Jr. for governor, Addison Gardiner for lieutenant governor; and an electoral ticket pledged to James K. Polk.

The Whig state convention met on September 11 at Syracuse, Francis Granger was chairman. They nominated Millard Fillmore for governor; Samuel J. Wilkin for lieutenant governor; and an electoral ticket pledged to Henry Clay.

U.S. Senator Silas Wright, Jr. (D) was elected Governor of New York, and resigned his seat in November 1844. On November 30, Gov. Bouck appointed Lt. Gov. Daniel S. Dickinson (D) and State Senator Henry A. Foster (D) to fill the two vacancies temporarily.

State Senate

Districts
 The First District (4 seats) consisted of Kings, New York and Richmond counties.
 The Second District (4 seats) consisted of Dutchess, Orange, Putnam, Queens, Rockland, Suffolk, Sullivan, Ulster and Westchester counties.
 The Third District (4 seats) consisted of Albany, Columbia, Delaware, Greene, Rensselaer, Schenectady and Schoharie counties.
 The Fourth District (4 seats) consisted of Clinton, Essex, Franklin, Fulton, Hamilton, Herkimer, Montgomery, St. Lawrence, Saratoga, Warren and Washington counties.
 The Fifth District (4 seats) consisted of Jefferson, Lewis, Madison, Oneida, Oswego and Otsego counties.
 The Sixth District (4 seats) consisted of Allegany, Broome, Cattaraugus, Chemung, Chenango, Livingston, Steuben, Tioga and Tompkins counties.
 The Seventh District (4 seats) consisted of Cayuga, Cortland, Onondaga, Ontario, Seneca, Wayne and Yates counties.
 The Eighth District (4 seats) consisted of Chautauqua, Erie, Genesee, Monroe, Niagara, Orleans and Wyoming counties.

Note: There are now 62 counties in the State of New York. The counties which are not mentioned in this list had not yet been established, or sufficiently organized, the area being included in one or more of the abovementioned counties.

Members
The asterisk (*) denotes members of the previous legislature who continued in office as members of this legislature. David R. Floyd-Jones and Joshua B. Smith changed from the Assembly to the Senate.

Employees
 Clerk: Isaac R. Elwood
 Deputy Clerks: Charles Bryan, Hiram Leonard
 Sergeant-at-Arms: Charles Niven
 Doorkeeper: Joel Gillett
 Assistant Doorkeeper: Martin Miller

State Assembly

Districts

 Albany County (3 seats)
 Allegany County (2 seats)
 Broome County (1 seat)
 Cattaraugus County (2 seats)
 Cayuga County (3 seats)
 Chautauqua County (3 seats)
 Chemung County (1 seat)
 Chenango County (3 seats)
 Clinton County (1 seat)
 Columbia County (3 seats)
 Cortland County (2 seats)
 Delaware County (2 seats)
 Dutchess County (3 seats)
 Erie County (3 seats)
 Essex County (1 seat)
 Franklin County (1 seat)
 Fulton and Hamilton counties (1 seat)
 Genesee County (2 seats)
 Greene County (2 seats)
 Herkimer County (2 seats)
 Jefferson County (3 seats)
 Kings County (2 seats)
 Lewis County (1 seat)
 Livingston County (2 seats)
 Madison County (3 seats)
 Monroe County (3 seats)
 Montgomery County (2 seats)
 The City and County of New York (13 seats)
 Niagara County (2 seats)
 Oneida County (4 seats)
 Onondaga County (4 seats)
 Ontario County (3 seats)
 Orange County (3 seats)
 Orleans County (1 seat)
 Oswego County (2 seats)
 Otsego County (3 seats)
 Putnam County (1 seat)
 Queens County (1 seat)
 Rensselaer County (3 seats)
 Richmond County (1 seat)
 Rockland County (1 seat)
 St. Lawrence County (2 seats)
 Saratoga County (2 seats)
 Schenectady County (1 seat)
 Schoharie County (2 seats)
 Seneca County (1 seat)
 Steuben County (3 seats)
 Suffolk County (2 seats)
 Sullivan County (1 seat)
 Tioga County (1 seat)
 Tompkins County (2 seats)
 Ulster County (2 seats)
 Warren County (1 seat)
 Washington (2 seats)
 Wayne County (2 seats)
 Westchester County (2 seats)
 Wyoming County (2 seats)
 Yates County (1 seat)

Note: There are now 62 counties in the State of New York. The counties which are not mentioned in this list had not yet been established, or sufficiently organized, the area being included in one or more of the abovementioned counties.

Assemblymen
The asterisk (*) denotes members of the previous legislature who continued as members of this legislature.

Employees
 Clerk: James R. Rose
 Sergeant-at-Arms: Jonathan P. Couch
 Doorkeeper: John P. Davis
 Assistant Doorkeeper: David E. Williams
 Second Assistant Doorkeeper: John Moore

Notes

Sources
 The New York Civil List compiled by Franklin Benjamin Hough (Weed, Parsons and Co., 1858) [pg. 109 and 441 for Senate districts; pg. 134 for senators; pg. 148f for Assembly districts; pg. 228f for assemblymen]
 Political History of the State of New York from January 1, 1841, to January 1, 1847, Vol III, including the Life of Silas Wright (Hall & Dickson, Syracuse NY, 1848; pg. 368 to 565)
 The Whig Almanac and Politicians Register for 1844 (pg. 56)

067
1844 in New York (state)
1844 U.S. legislative sessions